The Sheriff of Nottinghamshire, Derbyshire and the Royal Forests is a position established by the Normans in England.

The sheriff is the oldest secular office under the Crown.  Formerly the  sheriff was the principal law enforcement officer in the county but over the centuries most of the responsibilities associated with the post have been transferred elsewhere or are now defunct, so that its functions are now largely ceremonial.

From 1068 until 1566 the position existed as Sheriff of Nottinghamshire, Derbyshire and the Royal Forests but after 1566 separate appointments were made as Sheriff of Derbyshire and Sheriff of Nottinghamshire.

List of officeholders
This is a list of sheriffs in the period 1068–1568.

11th–14th century
1068: William Peverel
1069–1080: Hugh fitzBaldric
1081–1087: Hugh de Port
?–1105: Richard fitz Gotse
1105: Helgot
1114: William I, Peveril
1125: Roger de Lovetot
1127–1129: Ivo de Hertz
1129: Osbert Sylvanus
1129–1153: William Peverel the Younger
1154: Osbert Sylvanus
1155–1156: Radulf son of Engelrami
1160–1164: Radulf son of Engelrami
1165–1168: Sir Robert FitzRanulph
1169–1176: William FitzRalph
1177: William FitzRalph and Serlo de Grendon
1178: Serlo de Grendon
1179: William FitzRalph ( also Seneschal of Normandy) and Serlo de Grendon
1180–1186: Radulf Murdac
1190–1191: Roger de Lacy
1191–1194: William de Wendenal
1194: William de Ferrers, 4th Earl of Derby (for seven weeks)
1194–1199: William Brewer
1200–1201: Hugh Bardulf and William de Lech
1202: Hugh Bardulf and Reginald de Karduil
1203–1208: Robert de Vieuxpont, Richard De Bello Campo (Richard Beauchamp)
1208: Gérard d'Athée and Philip Marc
1209–1211: Philip Marc and Peter Markes
1212: Philip Marc and Eustace De Ludham (Sheriff of Yorkshire 1225).
1216–1221: Philip Marc
1222–1224: Ralph Fitz Nicholas
1225–1232: Ralph Fitz Nicholas and Hugo le Bell
1233–1234: Ralph Fitz Nicholas and William le Derley
1232: Eustace de Ludham
1234: Brian de Lisle (Also castellan of Knaresborough (Yorkshire) in 1205, Sheriff of Yorkshire in 1206 and succeeded Robert de Vieuxpont in charge of the Archbishopric of York).
1236–1239: Hugh Fitz Ralph and Robert de Vavasour, Lord of Bilborough
1240–1241: William de Cantilupe and Baldwin de Pannton
1242–1246: Baldwin de Pannton
1247–1254: Robert de Vavasor
1255: Sir Walter De Eastwood, then from May 1258 Roger de Lovetot.
1256–1257: Roger de Lunetal
1258–1259: Simon De Heydon
1260: Simon de Asselacton (Aslockton)
1261–1262: John de Balliol and Simon de Heydon
1263–1264: William, son of Herbert and son Henry
1265–1269: Reginald de Grey, 1st Baron Grey de Wilton and Hugh de Stapleford.
1267: Simon de Hedon but from Michaelmas, Gerard his son and Hugh de Stapleford.
1270–1271: Hugh de Stapleford and Walter, Archbishop of York.
1271: Hugh de Babbington (Under Sheriff to Walter, Archbishop of York)
1272: Walter Giffard, archbishop of York.
1274: Walter de Stirclerle or Stirkelegh.
1278: Reginald de Grey, 1st Baron Grey de Wilton, but from (Michaelmas), Gervasse de Willesford and John de Anesle.
1279–1283: Sir Gervase Clifton (d.1323) of Clifton Hall, Nottingham
1285: John de Anesle
1290: Gervase de Clifton but from (Michaelmas) William de Chaddewich and Hugh de Stapelford.
1291: William de Chaworth
1293: Phillip of Paunton
1295: Walter de Goushill of Hoveringham
1297: John de Harrington
1298: Ralph de Shirley
1300: Richard de Furneaux
1301: Ralph de Shirley
1303: Petrus Picott
1307: Willielmus de Chellasdeston (Chellaston).
1308: Petrus Picott Willielmus de Chellasdeston.
1309: Johannes de Strichesley.
1310: Thomas de Swyneford.
1311: Radulphus de Crophulle.
1312: Johannes de la Beche.
1313: Radulphus de Crophulle.
1315: Johannes de Bella Fide (John Beaufie)
1318: Henry de Fauconberg (1st term)(Sheriff of Yorkshire 1323–27)
1319: Hugo de Stokes. Henricus de Fauconbridge.
1320–1322: Sir John Darcy
1322: Robert Ingram
1323: Henry de Fauconberg (2nd term)
1324: Sir Ralph de Braylesford of Brailsford, Derbyshire
1327: Robert Ingram.
1329: Thomas de Longvillers.
1329: Henry Fauconberg (3rd term) and Edmund de Cressy
1330: Johannes Bret
1331: Robertus de Joice
1334: Johannes de Oxon.
1338: Egidius de Meynell.
1341: Hugo de Hercy.
1342: Nicholaus de Longford.
1344: Johannes de Musters.
1345: Gervase de Clifton (1313–1391) of Clifton Hall, Nottingham
1346: Thomas de Bekeringe.
1347: Johannes de Vaux.
1350: Johannes Walleys.
1362: Robert Morton.
1381: John Bosun
1383: Sir John Leake
1385: John Gateford of Gateford
1387: Sir John Leake
1389: Sir Robert Fraunceys
1391: Sir Nicholas Montgomery of Marston Montgomery
1391: John Gateford of Gateford
1393: Sir John Leake
1393: Thomas Rempstone
1396: John Gateford of Gateford
1397–1399: Robert Morton of Harworth
1399: Sir John Leake
John de Keynes

15th century

16th century to 1568

References
Fuller, Thomas. The history of the worthies of England. Volume 1.

Bibliography

Local government in Derbyshire
Local government in Nottinghamshire
Nottinghamshire
Defunct forestry agencies
High Sheriff
High Sheriff